The women's singles badminton event at the 2018 Commonwealth Games was held from 10 to 15 April 2018 at the Carrara Sports and Leisure Centre on the Gold Coast, Australia. The defending gold medalist was Michelle Li of Canada.

The athletes were drawn into straight knockout stage. The draw for the competition was conducted on 2 April 2018.

Seeds
The seeds for the tournament were:

  (silver medalist)
  (gold medalist)
  (fourth place)
 ' (bronze medalist)

  (quarter-finals)  (quarter-finals)  (quarter-finals)  (quarter-finals)''

Results

Finals

Top half

Section 1

Section 2

Bottom half

Section 3

Section 4

References

Women's singles